Nikolas Walstad (born 14 February 1997) is a Norwegian football defender who plays as a left back for Haugesund.

References

1997 births
Living people
People from Rælingen
Norwegian footballers
Ullensaker/Kisa IL players
Mjøndalen IF players
FK Haugesund players
Norwegian First Division players
Eliteserien players
Association football defenders
Norway youth international footballers